A popover is a light roll made from an egg batter similar to that of Yorkshire pudding, typically baked in muffin tins or dedicated popover pans, which have straight-walled sides rather than angled.

Popovers may be served either as a sweet, topped with fruit and whipped cream; or, butter and jam for breakfast; or, with afternoon tea; or, with meats at lunch and dinner.

Name
The name "popover" comes from the fact that the batter swells or "pops" over the top of the tin while baking. Popovers are also known as Laplanders.

History
The popover is an American version of Yorkshire pudding and similar batter puddings made in England since the 17th century,

The oldest known reference to popovers dates to 1850. The first cookbook to print a recipe for popovers was in 1876.

A variant of popovers with garlic and herbs is called Portland (Oregon) popover pudding. Other American popover variations include replacing some of the flour with pumpkin puree and adding spices such as allspice or nutmeg. Most American popovers today, however, are not flavored with meat or herbs. Instead, they have a buttery taste.

Ogden Nash inverts the historical order of events.
Let's call Yorkshire pudding
A fortunate blunder:
It's a sort of popover
That turned and popped under.

Preparation
Popovers require flour, eggs (which provide the buoyancy), milk, a dash of salt, and, if additional browning is desired, sugar.
The dry ingredients are mixed, and then the wet are added. Beat until batter is smooth.
Generously grease a muffin or cupcake tin to prevent sticking and fill each cup, but never fill to the top. The batter will expand while baking.
Bake at medium high heat, and avoid slamming doors or sudden loud noises as the popovers bake, as this may impede rising. 
Once browned, remove from oven carefully, as the popovers will be hot and each will have a bulb filled with hot air.

References

American breads
Breakfast dishes
Quick breads